Black Friday is the eighth mixtape by American hip hop recording artist Jay Rock. It was released on November 26, 2010, for free download and then on December 7, 2010, via iTunes and Amazon.com, under Top Dawg Entertainment. It was Jay Rock's last mixtape before the release of his debut studio album Follow Me Home.

Background 
The mixtape was interactive as it gained some of its tracks thanks to fans' feedback on Twitter and fans also helped shape the album cover. Music videos were released for "No Joke", "Diary of a Broke Nigga" and "Get on Your Shit".

Lyrics, production and themes 
The lyrics stay true to the typical rags-to-riches street narrative style, adding a sense of regularity to the mixtape, though it rarely crosses over into redundancy, thanks to Jay Rock's delivery.

The production embodies astral atmospheric sounds that evoke feelings of an urban cement dreamscape over the traditional hip-hop elements. "Walk by Me" production was described as trademark G-Funk synth on steady loop over the deep groove of drums and bass.

The mixtapes themes were described as "street" related and Rock's rapping was described as "reality rap". Ology described the mixtape as a "street narrative"

Guests and production 
The mixtape features guest appearances from Black Hippy members Kendrick Lamar, Schoolboy Q and Ab-Soul along with Big Scoob, Trae Tha Truth and Spider Loc among others. The production was handled by Focus..., Crada and DJ Khalil, as well as in-house producers from Top Dawg Entertainment, such as Willie B and Sounwave, representing Digi+Phonics.

Critical reception 
Black Friday received critical acclaim upon its release. It was named the 83rd best mixtape of 2010 by XXL and described as a "banger". Ab-Soul's features were widely praised by critics.

Track listing 

 Samples
 "Still in the Hood" samples "Fully Loaded Clip" by 50 Cent.
 "Kush Freestyle" samples "Kush" by Dr. Dre.
 "Diary of a Broke Nigga" samples "What's Your Name" by The Moments.
 "Shadow of Death" samples "Dance Music" by R. D. Burman.

References 

2010 mixtape albums
Jay Rock albums
Top Dawg Entertainment albums
Albums produced by Sounwave